Dorothea Margrethe Schjoldager (19 September 1853 – 30 September 1938) was a noted Norwegian feminist and proponent for women's rights. She worked as a school teacher and social worker. 

She was born at Tromsø in Troms, Norway.  She was the daughter of Hagbart Nilsen Schjoldager (1823-1873) and Anna Margrethe Figenschou (1832-1874).
In 1862, her family relocated to Vardo in Finnmark. She grew up as the eldest siblings of six. Her parents both died early, and she gained full responsibility for her younger siblings. She was a school teacher, first in Vardo and later at Steinkjer in the Nord-Trøndelag, From 1875 she worked in Kristiania (now Oslo). From 1876 she was a teacher at Møllergata skole where she taught until 1923.

She was also very engaged in social work among alcoholics, prostitutes, prisoners and children in public care.  She was actively involved with the 
Norwegian Association for Women's Rights (Norsk Kvinnesaksforening) and the Norwegian National Women's Council (Norske Kvinners Nasjonalråd). She was a board member of Kristiania vergeråd from 1900 to 1927. In 1901, she initiated the establishing of the first homes for unmarried mothers in Kristiania. She contributed to the public debate, and argued in favour of female priests in the Church of Norway, as well as for women as police and prison workers.

She was never married and was the sister-in-law of Norwegian author Hans Aanrud.

References 

1853 births
1938 deaths
People from Tromsø
Norwegian schoolteachers
Norwegian women's rights activists
Norwegian women activists
Norwegian Association for Women's Rights people